The United States Golf Association Museum and Arnold Palmer Center for Golf History is home to the world's premier collection of golf artifacts and memorabilia. It is located adjacent to the United States Golf Association’s headquarters in Liberty Corner, Bernards Township Somerset County, New Jersey.

The USGA Museum is an educational institution dedicated to fostering an appreciation for the game of golf, its participants, and the Association. It serves as a caretaker and steward for the game’s history, supporting the Association’s role in ensuring the game’s future.

By collecting, preserving, and interpreting the historical developments of the game in the United States, with an emphasis on the Association and its championships, the Museum aims to promote a greater understanding of golf’s cultural significance for a worldwide audience.

Museum history 

The origins of the USGA Museum can be traced to 1935, when George Blossom, a member of the USGA’s Executive Committee, first proposed the creation of a collection of historical golf artifacts. One year later, in an effort to formalize the Museum, the USGA Museum and Library Committee was created with the primary function of collecting historically significant artifacts and books. The first significant donation to the Museum – Bobby Jones’ legendary putter, Calamity Jane II – followed in 1938.

For the first 16 years of its existence, the Museum had no formal home and artifacts were displayed throughout the USGA offices in New York. In 1951, when the Association purchased the property at 40 East 38th Street in New York City, the first dedicated display space for the collections was created and the Museum was formally opened. Since 1972, the USGA's headquarters in Liberty Corner, New Jersey, has provided public exhibition galleries, staff offices and collections storage for the Museum. The Museum is housed in a building designed in 1919 by John Russell Pope, a noted architect who also designed the National Archives Building and the Jefferson Memorial.

In 2005, the Museum was closed for a three-year renovation and expansion project.

Museum exhibits 

The USGA Museum showcases the nation's largest and most significant collection of golf artifacts and documents. The interactive multimedia exhibits tell the story of the game's development in the United States, highlighting the greatest moments in the game's history, with a particular focus on USGA champions and championships.

The Spirit of Championship Golf
A six-minute introductory film – The Spirit of Championship Golf – brings visitors into the world of USGA championships, exploring the physical, mental, and emotional skills required to excel at the game's highest level. The program comprises interviews with USGA national champions, including some of the game's most popular players such as Hale Irwin, Peter Jacobsen, Nancy Lopez, Arnold Palmer, and Annika Sörenstam.

The Hall of Champions
The Hall of Champions, the signature architectural space in the Arnold Palmer Center for Golf History, celebrates every USGA champion and championship to date. The oval rotunda, illuminated by a clerestory, houses all 13 USGA national championship trophies, while the names of every USGA champion, such as eight-time winners Bobby Jones and Tiger Woods, are inscribed on bronze panels that encircle the room.

Permanent Galleries
The Permanent Galleries in the USGA Museum tell the story of golf in America, from the late 19th century to the present. Each gallery focuses on an era and iconic moment – champions and events in the game's history that are pivotal for understanding the growth, evolution, and significance of the game in U.S. history.  Special rooms are dedicated to Bobby Jones, Ben Hogan, and Arnold Palmer.

The Pynes Putting Course 

The course was inspired by the world-renowned Himalayas Putting Green at St Andrews Links in Scotland. Starting positions for each hole are marked. Par is not indicated on the course scorecard but two-putts are well-earned.

The Pynes Putting Course is open to visitors during regular museum hours annually from April to October, weather permitting. Museum visitors receive a souvenir square-mesh golf ball and can choose from replicas of four classic putters, such as Bobby Jones’ famous Calamity Jane II, to play the nine-hole course that is altered on a weekly basis.

See also 

 Golf in the United States
 History of golf
 Jack Nicklaus Museum
 British Golf Museum

References

External links 
USGA Museum website
 USGA website
 USGA Photo Collection online store

Golf museums and halls of fame
Golf in the United States
Sports museums in New Jersey
Museums in Somerset County, New Jersey
Museums established in 1936
1936 establishments in New Jersey
John Russell Pope buildings
Bernards Township, New Jersey